Eve Lindley (born 1993) is an American actress. She is best known for her roles in the television series Dispatches from Elsewhere and the film All We Had. In 2016, she was named in Out magazine's OUT100. As a model she has worked with Barneys New York.

Biography 
Eve Lindley was born January 12, 1993, in Danbury, Connecticut, to an American father and Cuban mother. She has two older sisters. Her parents divorced when she was two years old, and were granted joint custody. By the time she was in seventh grade, she lived full-time with her father. Lindley is a trans woman. She started transitioning in high school with her father's support.

Before making her film debut in All We Had at the 2016 Tribeca Film Festival, Lindley worked in costumemaking, sales, and as a barista and dog-walker, among other jobs. She is best known for starring in the AMC series Dispatches from Elsewhere as Simone, starring alongside Jason Segel, Sally Field, and Andre Benjamin.

Filmography

Film

Television

Theater

References

Further reading 
 Caroline John (3 March 2020) Eve Lindley Wiki: Facts About the Trans Actress in "Dispatches from Elsewhere". Earn the Necklace

External links 

1993 births
American film actresses
American people of Cuban descent
American television actresses
Hispanic and Latino American actresses
LGBT Hispanic and Latino American people
Living people
Transgender actresses
Transgender female models
American female models
21st-century American actresses
American LGBT actors